The 14th congressional district of Ohio is in the far northeast corner of the state, bordering Lake Erie and Pennsylvania. It is currently represented in the United States House of Representatives by Dave Joyce.

As defined in January 2023, it contains all of Ashtabula, Lake, Trumbull, Portage and Geauga counties.

Recent election results from statewide races

List of members representing the district

Recent election results

The following chart shows historic election results.
 "√" indicates victor
 "(inc.)" indicates incumbent

Historical district boundaries

See also
Ohio's congressional districts
List of United States congressional districts

References

 Congressional Biographical Directory of the United States 1774–present

14
1823 establishments in Ohio
Constituencies established in 1823